is a 1933 anime short film by Kenzō Masaoka and the first Japanese anime of any type to feature voiceovers. The film was released in black and white. There are no known prints of this film available, and it is considered a lost film.

Chikara was listed as one of the "Best of Best" by the 12th Japan Media Arts Festival.

Plot

The protagonist is a father of four children. Because he is constantly being henpecked at home, he becomes involved in an affair with a typist at his company and accidentally tells his wife about it while talking in his sleep. After obtaining additional evidence of the affair, she goes to confront both her husband and the typist at her husband's office.

Production
In 1927, The Jazz Singer was released in the United States as the first talkie film, and Japanese film companies began working on creating them as well. Shochiku released  in 1931, the first Japanese talkie. Due to the success of this film, the president of Shochiku, Shirō Kido, commissioned Masaoka to make the first anime talkie, and he began working on it immediately.

Masaoka worked on the film for a little over a year and finally completed it in October 1932. The film was released in theaters the following year on 13 April 1933. At this time, the job of voice actor did not exist, so Shochiku used regular actors for the voice parts. Casting well-known stars, such as Roppa Furukawa and  Ranko Sawa (of the Takarazuka Revue), helped make the film a success.

Staff
Original Creator, Script: Tadao Ikeda
Original Planning, Director: Kenzō Masaoka
Animation: Mitsuyo Seo, Seiichi Harada, Saburō Yamamoto
Photography: Kakuzan Kimura
Producer: Shirō Kido
Voiceover Director: Hiromasa Nomura
Audio: Haruo Tsuchihashi
Music Director: Masanori Imasawa

Sources:

Cast
Main character: Roppa Furukawa
Wife: Ranko Sawa
Typist: Yōko Murashima
Tarō: Akio Isono
Jirō: Hideo Mitsui
Hanako: Fusako Fujita
Toshiko: Yōko Fujita

Sources:

See also
List of lost films

References

External links

1933 anime films
1933 films
1933 short films
Anime short films
Lost animated films
1930s animated short films
Shochiku films
Films with screenplays by Tadao Ikeda
Lost Japanese films
1933 lost films
Japanese black-and-white films